The women's 4 × 100 metres relay at the 2013 World Championships in Athletics was held at the Luzhniki Stadium on 18 August.

In the final, Jamaica and the United States were out early, Jamaica passing first.  The British team seemed to be keeping up with the leaders, passing efficiently.  At the second handoff, English Gardner seemed to leave even with Schillonie Calvert, while Alexandria Anderson had not arrived with the baton yet.  Gardner had to come to a complete stop at the end of the zone to wait for the baton, finally resuming with a legal handoff in dead last place.  Inside of USA, France was having similar difficulties with the baton.  By the final handoff, Jamaica had an 8-meter lead on the second place Russian team, Gold medalist Shelly-Ann Fraser-Pryce on the anchor pulling away and victory assured.  Jamaica dominated the race finishing with a championship record 41.29.  Coming down the straight, Britain's Hayley Jones was swallowed up by France's Stella Akakpo, Germany's Verena Sailer and American Octavious Freeman speeding from the back trying to make up lost ground. Freeman was able to pass three teams in the last few steps but France beat USA to the line.  The French relay team members were duly presented their silver medals during the medal ceremony. After the medal ceremony, the British team filed a protest against the French team, claiming that the latter had an out-of-zone baton handover between Ayodelé Ikuesan and Myriam Soumaré. More than two hours after the race, the French relay team was officially disqualified. The French delegation appealed against their disqualification, but it was in vain. Consequently, the American team was upgraded to the silver medal and the British team received the bronze medal. Bernard Amsalem, the president of the Fédération française d'athlétisme, called the French team's disqualification "an outrage". He explained that normally the decision to disqualify a team had to be made before the medal ceremony and teams had to file protests within thirty minutes from the end of the race. With this 4x100m victory, Shelly-Ann Fraser-Pryce became the first woman to win the sprint triple (100, 200, 4x100) at the World Athletics Championships

Records
Prior to the competition, the records were as follows:

Qualification standards

Schedule

Results

Heats
Qualification: First 2 of each heat (Q) plus the 2 fastest times (q) advanced to the final.

Final
The final was started at 18:10.

References

External links
4 × 100 metres relay results at IAAF website

4 x 100 metres relay
Relays at the World Athletics Championships
4 × 100 metres relay
2013 in women's athletics